Michael Ambrose (born October 5, 1993) is an American former professional soccer player who played as a defender.

Career

Early career
Ambrose spent four seasons with the FC Dallas Development Academy before signing a letter of intent to play college soccer at the University of Maryland. He made a total of 71 appearances for the Terrapins and tallied one goal and 15 assists.

Ambrose also played for the Austin Aztex while they were playing in the Premier Development League.

Professional
On January 14, 2015, Ambrose left college early to sign a professional contract with the Austin Aztex who moved up to the USL. He made his professional debut on March 28 in a 2–0 victory over the Colorado Springs Switchbacks.

In August 2016, Ambrose was traded by Dallas to Orlando City SC in exchange for a third-round pick in the 2018 MLS SuperDraft.

In December 2016, Ambrose was selected by expansion side Atlanta United FC in the 2016 MLS Expansion Draft.

In November 2019, Ambrose was selected by expansion side Inter Miami CF in the first stage of the 2019 MLS Re-Entry Draft. Miami opted to decline his contract option following the 2020 season.

On December 22, 2020, it was announced that Ambrose would re-join Atlanta United as a free agent ahead of their 2021 season. Ambrose's contract option was declined by Atlanta following the 2022 season.

International
Ambrose also has represented the United States in the U17, U18 and U20 level.

Personal life
Ambrose is from El Paso, Texas. He has three siblings. Ambrose is a Christian.

Career statistics

References

External links
 
 Maryland bio

1993 births
Living people
American soccer players
Maryland Terrapins men's soccer players
Austin Aztex players
Orlando City B players
Orlando City SC players
Atlanta United FC players
Atlanta United 2 players
Charleston Battery players
Inter Miami CF players
Association football defenders
Soccer players from El Paso, Texas
USL League Two players
USL Championship players
Major League Soccer players
United States men's youth international soccer players
United States men's under-20 international soccer players